Adrenalyn XL is a football trading card game produced by Panini. In 2010 they featured 22 of the 32 FIFA World Cup 2010 teams. The England players show only the player's heads and say England Superstar on them. There are 18 England Cards and they have 3 Champions Cards. There are 350 Cards. There are 250 Base Cards, 25 Star Players, 25 Goal Stoppers, 25 Fan's Favourites and 25 Champions. Each card has a rating in attack and defense there is also an overall rating the players are rated out of 100. They bear only a few differences from the Super Strikes collection. One of which is that the font on the cards are different and that they sport a FIFA World Cup 2010 logo at the top right hand corner of the card and at the back of the card.

In 2010 Panini also released a UEFA Champions League-edition, containing  350 cards from 22 of the competing clubs, including such clubs as Barcelona, Arsenal and Lyon.

The odds for each of the inserts was as per 2010/2011:
Star player - 1 in 4 packets
Goal Stopper - 1 in 5 packets
Fan's Favourite - 1 in 8 packets
Champion - 1 in 24 packets

The odds for each of the inserts is today (Nordic Edition in Denmark):
Rising star - 1 in 6 packets
Star player - 1 in 6 packets
Fan's Favourite - 1 in 8 packets
Goal Stopper - 1 in 11,4 packets
Master - 1 in 15 packets
Top Master 1 in 60 packets
Legend 1 in 80 packets
Scandinavian Star 1 in 80 packets
Dansk Mester 1 in 80 packets
Card features

Each card features an attack, defence and an overall rating. They feature the player in the middle of the card and the player's team at the top left hand corner of the card. They also show the player's position (Goalkeeper, Defender, Midfielder or Forward) at the back of the card. Star players and Goal Stoppers sport a glitter foil effect while Fan's Favourites sport a Rainbow Foil effect. Champions sports a black/gold foil effect. The fourth edition of Panini FIFA 365 Adrenalyn XL was released for 2019, featuring top clubs, teams and players.

References 

Card games introduced in 2009
Trading cards
Collectible card games